Hedgelawn, also known as the Kohl House, was a historic home located near Middletown, New Castle County, Delaware. It was built in 1856, and is -story, five bay, clapboard clad frame dwelling with a flat roof. It is "L"-shaped. The design was influenced by the Greek Revival, Italianate, and Georgian styles. Also on the property was a contributing hipped roof privy. Hedgelawn was the home of William R. Cochran, son of John P. Cochran, 43rd Governor of Delaware (1875–1879). Prior to its demolition, the nearby Rumsey Farm house was almost identical to Hedgelawn.

It was listed on the National Register of Historic Places in 1973.

On April 30, 2017, Hedgelawn was burned to the ground in a controlled demolition, in order to make way for a motorcycle retail business. Its fate was similar to that of the nearby Summerton Mansion, also in Middletown, which was razed in 2016 to make way for a gas station.

References

External links

Historic American Buildings Survey in Delaware
Houses on the National Register of Historic Places in Delaware
Georgian architecture in Delaware
Italianate architecture in Delaware
Greek Revival houses in Delaware
Houses completed in 1856
Houses in New Castle County, Delaware
National Register of Historic Places in New Castle County, Delaware
Demolished buildings and structures in Delaware
Buildings and structures demolished in 2016